is a former Japanese football player. She played for Japan national team.

Club career
Hironaka played for L.League club Nissan FC. She was selected Fighting Spirit prize in 1990 season.

National team career
In October 1984, Hironaka was selected by the Japan national team for a tour in China. On October 17, she debuted for Japan against Italy. She was a member of the national team in 1986 and in the 1989 AFC Championship. She also played in the 1990 Asian Games. That competition was her last game for Japan. She played 21 games and scored 3 goals for Japan between 1984 and 1990.

National team statistics

References

Year of birth missing (living people)
Living people
Japanese women's footballers
Japan women's international footballers
Nadeshiko League players
Nissan FC Ladies players
Asian Games silver medalists for Japan
Asian Games medalists in football
Women's association footballers not categorized by position
Footballers at the 1990 Asian Games
Medalists at the 1990 Asian Games